Magnum Research Inc. (MRI) was an American privately held corporation based in Fridley, Minnesota which manufactured and distributed firearms. The majority owners, Jim Skildum (President and CEO) and John Risdall (Chairman, COO), had been with the company since its founding in 1979.

In June 2010 Magnum Research, in financial difficulties, was sold to Kahr Arms, an American-based producer of compact pistols.

Products 

MRI was responsible for the design and development of the Desert Eagle pistol.  The design was refined and for some time the pistols were also manufactured by Israel Military Industries until 1995, when MRI shifted the manufacturing contract and license to Saco Defense in Saco, Maine. In 1998 MRI shifted manufacturing back to IMI, which later reorganized under the name Israel Weapon Industries. Since 2009 the Desert Eagle Pistol has been exclusively produced in the USA only, at MRI’s Pillager, Minnesota facility.  Both Saco and IMI/IWI were strictly manufacturing contractors: all of the intellectual property, including patents, copyrights and trademarks of the Desert Eagle since its creation have been the property of Magnum Research Incorporated, excluding the patent on the production model which was owned by IMI.

Magnum Research imported the IMI/IWI Jericho 941 series of pistols under the Baby Eagle name until the end of 2008 and resumed importation of this model in 2011 under the name Baby Eagle II. Currently, the Baby Eagle name is used on a new series of striker-fired polymer-framed pistols.  For a time they also imported the Barak SP-21 pistol, but it is no longer offered. Other products include the BFR series of single-action magnum revolvers, the Mountain Eagle rifle, Magnum Lite rifle, and Micro Desert Eagle.

MRI offered custom gunsmithing services and had a line of guns that were coated with titanium nitride in artful patterns and designs.

Current models 

 Magnum Research DE1911G, DE1911C, and DE1911U 
 Desert Eagle (Mark VII pistol, Mark XIX pistol)
 Magnum Lite (rimfire rifle)
 Magnum Research BFR (Big Frame Revolver)
 Micro Desert Eagle (.380 ACP)
 MR Eagle Series Pistols
 Mountain Eagle (center-fire rifle)
 New Baby Eagle "Fast Action"
 Desert Eagle 1911 (.45 ACP)
 Baby Eagle II

Discontinued models

 Original Baby Eagle (9mm, .40 S&W, or .45 ACP)
 Lone Eagle (single-shot, center-fire pistol for rifle cartridges)
 Magnum Research SP-21
 Mountain Eagle pistol (.22 LR)
 MR9/MR40 Eagle (Walther P99 versions, with the frame supplied by Walther)

References

External links 
 Magnum Research, Inc.
 IMI Systems

Companies based in Pike County, Pennsylvania
American companies established in 1979
Firearm manufacturers of the United States
Firearms manufacturers in Pennsylvania
Manufacturing companies based in Pennsylvania
Manufacturing companies established in 1979
Companies disestablished in 2010
1979 establishments in Pennsylvania
2010 disestablishments in Pennsylvania
Manufacturing companies based in Minnesota